Serhiy Petrovych Novikov (December 15, 1949 in Moscow - April 16. 2021) was a Ukrainian & Russian Soviet judo Olympic champion. He competed for the Soviet Union at the 1976 Summer Olympics, where he won the gold medal in the men's heavyweight division. He also competed at the 1980 Summer Olympics, in the open category.

In 2000 he founded the International Unifight Federation, in Paris. He went on to serve as the President of Russian Unifight Federation.

References

External links
 

1949 births
2021 deaths
Ukrainian male judoka
Russian male judoka
Soviet male judoka
Olympic judoka of the Soviet Union
Judoka at the 1976 Summer Olympics
Judoka at the 1980 Summer Olympics
Olympic gold medalists for the Soviet Union
Olympic medalists in judo
Medalists at the 1976 Summer Olympics